David Graham Pole (11 December 1877 – 26 November 1952) was a British lawyer and Labour Party politician who served as Member of Parliament (MP) for South Derbyshire from 1929 to 1931. His parents were John Pole, a ship's captain, and Rossina Graham, both from Shetland.

Pole was an unsuccessful candidate at four times: in East Grinstead at the 1918 general election; at the Edinburgh North by-election in 1920; in Cardiff South 1922 general election; and in Cardiff Central 1924 general election.

He was elected as Member of Parliament (MP) for South Derbyshire at the 1929 general election, but was defeated at the 1931 general election by the Conservative Party candidate Paul Emrys-Evans. Pole did not stand for Parliament again. He died in Marylebone aged 74.

Pole was both a Fabian Society and a Theosophical Society activist.  As such he defended Annie Besant's taking and retention of Jiddu Krishnamurti and his brother Nityananda from their Indian magistrate father.  Per James Webb, The Occult Underground (Open Court Press, 1974), Pole edited a Theosophical publication Theosophy in Scotland among his many Theosophical endeavors.

References

External links 

1877 births
1952 deaths
Labour Party (UK) MPs for English constituencies
Members of the Parliament of the United Kingdom for constituencies in Derbyshire
UK MPs 1929–1931